HP6 or variant, may refer to:

 HP6, a postcode for Amersham, see HP postcode area
 hP6, a Pearson symbol
 Harry Potter and the Half-Blood Prince, the sixth Harry Potter novel
 Harry Potter and the Half-Blood Prince (film), the sixth Harry Potter film
 Handley Page Type F aka H.P.6, an airplane
 HP-6, a glider designed by Richard Schreder

See also
HP (disambiguation)